is Ali Project's 23rd single. This single was released on January 21, 2009 under the Mellow Head and Geneon label.

The single title was used as the opening theme for the anime series Sora Kake Girl.

This single's catalog number is LHCM-1048.

Track listing

Charts and sales

References

2008 songs
2009 singles
Ali Project songs
Anime songs